Mount Trorey is a  mountain summit located in British Columbia, Canada.

Description
Mount Trorey is set within Garibaldi Provincial Park. It is part of the Spearhead Range, which is a subset of the Garibaldi Ranges of the Coast Mountains. Precipitation runoff from the south side of the peak drains to Fitzsimmons Creek which is a tributary of the Cheakamus River, and meltwater from the Trorey Glacier on the northeastern slope drains into headwaters of Wedge Creek. Topographic relief is significant as the summit rises 1,160 meters (3,800 feet) above Fitzsimmons Creek in 1.5 kilometer (0.9 mile). Mount Trorey is often climbed as part of the Spearhead Traverse.

History
The name "Trorey Mountain" was adopted September 2, 1930, as recommended by the Garibaldi Park Board. The toponym was officially changed to "Mount Trorey" on December 31, 1966, by the Geographical Names Board of Canada.

The mountain is named after James John Trorey (1858–1941), a founding member of the Vancouver Mountaineering Club in 1907 (now known as the British Columbia Mountaineering Club). He was also a member of the team which made the first ascent of Mount Garibaldi on August 11, 1907.

The first ascent of Mt. Trorey was made in 1928 by a B.C. Garibaldi Survey party.

Climate

Based on the Köppen climate classification, Mount Trorey is located in the marine west coast climate zone of western North America. Most weather fronts originate in the Pacific Ocean, and travel east toward the Coast Mountains where they are forced upward by the range (Orographic lift), causing them to drop their moisture in the form of rain or snowfall. As a result, the Coast Mountains experience high precipitation, especially during the winter months in the form of snowfall. Winter temperatures can drop below −20 °C with wind chill factors below −30 °C. This climate supports the Trorey Glacier on the northeast slope of this mountain and the nearby Whistler Blackcomb ski resort.

See also
 
 Geography of British Columbia

References

External links
 Mount Trorey: Weather forecast

Garibaldi Ranges
Two-thousanders of British Columbia
Sea-to-Sky Corridor
New Westminster Land District
Coast Mountains